Pope Benedict I (died 30 July 579) was the bishop of Rome from 2 June 575 to his death.

Benedict was the son of a man named Boniface, and was called Bonosus by the Greeks. The ravages of the Lombards rendered it very difficult to communicate with the emperor at Constantinople, who claimed the privilege of confirming the election of popes. Hence there was a vacancy of nearly eleven months between the death of Pope John III and the arrival of the imperial confirmation of Benedict's election on 2 June 575.

Benedict granted an estate, the Massa Veneris, in the territory of Minturnae, to Abbot Stephen of St. Mark's "near the walls of Spoleto" (St. Gregory I, Ep. ix, 87, I. al. 30). Famine followed the devastating Lombards, and from the few words the Liber Pontificalis has about Benedict, we gather that he died in the midst of his efforts to cope with these difficulties. He was buried in the vestibule of the sacristy of the old Basilica of St. Peter. In a ceremony held in December, he ordained fifteen priests and three deacons and consecrated twenty-one bishops.

Few of the records of transactions outside Rome that could help understand Benedict's pontificate survive, and because of the disruptions caused by the Lombards in Italy, perhaps few ever existed.

References

External links
 

Popes
579 deaths
Popes of the Byzantine Papacy
Year of birth unknown
6th-century popes
Burials at St. Peter's Basilica